Immanuel Lutheran Church is a historic church at 1448 Cortlandt Street in Houston, Texas.

It was built in 1932 and added to the National Register of Historic Places in 1983.

References

Churches in Houston
Lutheran churches in Texas
Churches on the National Register of Historic Places in Texas
Gothic Revival church buildings in Texas
Churches completed in 1932
Churches in Harris County, Texas
1932 establishments in Texas
National Register of Historic Places in Houston